The following highways are numbered 482:

Canada
Manitoba Provincial Road 482

Japan
 Japan National Route 482

United States
 Florida State Road 482
 Maryland Route 482
 Puerto Rico Highway 482